Prince Eugene Jean of Savoy (Eugene Jean François; 23 September 1714 – 23 November 1734) was the last Count of Soissons and by birth member of the House of Savoy.

Life 
The only son of Emmanuel Thomas, Count of Soissons (a member of the House of Savoy-Carignano), and Princess Maria Theresia of Liechtenstein, he succeeded to his father's titles, Count of Soissons and Duke of Troppau, when the latter died in 1729. In 1731, Eugene Jean became a Knight in the Austrian Order of the Golden Fleece, like his father.

In Massa on 10 November 1734 he was married by proxy to Princess Maria Teresa Cybo-Malaspina (1725–1790), Duchess of Massa and Princess of Carrara in her own right. As the bridegroom died thirteen days later in Mannheim, however, the marriage was annulled on the basis that it was never consummated. Maria Teresa would later marry Ercole III d'Este, Duke of Modena.

With his death, the title "Count of Soissons" became extinct and reverted to the French crown. The title "Duke of Troppau" returned to his mother, whose estates passed to Franz Joseph I, Prince of Liechtenstein, when she died in 1772.

Ancestry 

1714 births
1734 deaths
Princes of Savoy
Eugene Jean of Savoy-Carignan
Knights of the Golden Fleece of Austria
Generals of the Holy Roman Empire